is the fourth full-length album of the Japanese rock band 9mm Parabellum Bullet, released on June 15, 2011.

Track listing

9mm Parabellum Bullet albums
2011 albums